Albert John "Jack" Fournier (August 4, 1892 – November 30, 1966) was a Canadian former professional ice hockey winger who played in the National Hockey Association.

Early life 
Fournier was born in Ottawa, Ontario, Canada.

Career 
During his career, Fournier played for the Montreal Canadiens and the Ottawa Senators. He won a Stanley Cup with the Canadiens in 1916.

References

External links

1892 births
1966 deaths
Canadian ice hockey right wingers
Ice hockey people from Ottawa
Montreal Canadiens (NHA) players
Ottawa Senators (NHA) players
Stanley Cup champions